Julius Urgiß (6 August 1873 in Anklam – 12 March 1948 in New York City) was a German-Jewish screenwriter, musician, and film critic.

He began his career as the author of various literary contributions. He worked as a senior journalist at the Berlin film journal Der Kinematograph, writing film reviews. He wrote a biography of the silent-film star Henny Porten.

In 1918, he began his career as a screenwriter. For seven years from 1919, he collaborated with Max Jungk, and in 1928 he worked with Friedrich Raff.  Urgiss provided material for comedies, dramas, historical materials and literary adaptations. After the Nazis came to power in 1933, he emigrated from Germany and lived in New York until his death in 1948.

He was married to the German soprano Gerty Lewin (1879-1927).  They had one daughter, Eva Agathe Urgiss (1911-1999), who married Albert Einstein's biographer and former step-son-in-law, Dr. Rudolf Kayser.

Filmography 

 Des Vaters Schuld (1918)
 (1918)
Maria (1919)
Morphium (1919)
 Die Sekretärin des Gesandten (1919)
Störtebeker (1919)
 Hearts are Trumps (1920)
 Whitechapel (1920)
 Uriel Acosta (1920)
 Children of Darkness (1921, 2 parts)
Der Erbe der van Diemen (1921)
Eine Frau mit Vergangenheit (1921)
 Hannerl and Her Lovers (1921)
 Sins of Yesterday (1922)
 The Stream (1922)
 Sodoms Ende (1922)
 She and the Three (1922)
 Revenge of the Bandits (1922)
 The Curse of Silence (1922)
 The Tigress (1922)
 Miss Julie (1922)
 The Love Story of Cesare Ubaldi (1922)
 The Street (1923)
 Explosion (1923)
 The Enchantress (1924)
 The Voice of the Heart (1924)
 Nanon (1924)
 Two People (1924)
 Der Sturz ins Glück (1924)
 Bismarck (1925)
 In the Name of the Kaisers (1925)
 Lace (1926)
 The Eleven Schill Officers (1926)
 German Hearts on the German Rhine (1926)
 Women of Passion (1926)
 Der Kampf um den Mann - Batalla de damas (1926)
 Make Up (1927)
 Hurrah! I Live! (1928)
 Beware of Loose Women (1929)
 A Mother's Love (1929)
 On the Reeperbahn at Half Past Midnight (1929)
 Bockbierfest (1930)
 Josef the Chaste (1930)
 Scandalous Eva (1930)
 Der Detektiv des Kaisers (1930)
 The Widow's Ball (1930)
 Wenn Du noch eine Heimat hast (1930)
 Money on the Street (1930)
 Kohlhiesel's Daughters (1930)
 Louise, Queen of Prussia (1931)
 Panic in Chicago (1931)
 Ich will Dich Liebe lehren (1933)

Other Works 
 Allgemeine Musiklehre (1939) Leipzig : Hörhold

References

External links 
 
 

1873 births
1948 deaths
German male screenwriters
German critics
Jewish emigrants from Nazi Germany to the United States
People from the Province of Pomerania
People from Anklam
German male non-fiction writers
Film people from Mecklenburg-Western Pomerania
20th-century German screenwriters